The men's 100 metres T33 event at the 2020 Summer Paralympics in Tokyo, took place on 30 August 2021.

The T33 category is for wheelchair athletes with cerebral palsy. Athletes in this class have moderate quadriplegia, and difficulty with forward trunk movement. They also may have hypertonia, ataxia and athetosis.

Records
Prior to the competition, the existing records were as follows:

Results
The final took place on 30 August 2021, at 10:33:

References

Men's 100 metres T33
2021 in men's athletics